Bharat Singh Chowhan is an Indian politician. He was elected to the lower House of Parliament the Lok Sabha from Dhar, Madhya Pradesh, India.

References

External links
 Official biographical sketch in Parliament of India website

India MPs 1962–1967
India MPs 1967–1970
India MPs 1971–1977
India MPs 1977–1979
Janata Party politicians
Bharatiya Jana Sangh politicians
1912 births
Year of death missing